Johns Island is one of the San Juan Islands in San Juan County, Washington. It lies just east of Stuart Island and north of Spieden Island. Johns Island is home to Camp Nor'wester, a summer camp for children on the west end of the island, and several dozen private vacation cabins on the east end of the island. It has a land area of 0.9083 km2 (0.3507 sq mi, or 224.45 acres). As with many of the outlying San Juan Islands, Johns Island does not have electricity or plumbing. There was a resident population of five persons as of the 2000 census.

References
Johns Island: Blocks 4005 and 4006, Census Tract 9603, San Juan County, Washington United States Census Bureau

San Juan Islands